Adijat Ayuba (born 11 October 1983) is a Nigerian judoka who compete in the women's category. She won a silver medal at the 2007 All-Africa Games and a bronze medal at the 2010 African Judo Championships.

Judo

Sports career 
Adijat Ayuba won a silver medal in the women's 78 kg event, at the 2007 All-Africa Games held in Algeir, Algeria.

While at the 2010 African Judo Championships at Yaoundé, Cameroon, she came second in the Open event and earned a bronze medal.

References 

1983 births
Living people
Nigerian female judoka
African Games medalists in judo
African Games silver medalists for Nigeria
Competitors at the 2007 All-Africa Games
20th-century Nigerian women
21st-century Nigerian women